The International Academy of the History of Science is a membership organization for historians of science.
The academy was founded on 17 August 1928 at the Congress of Historical Science by Aldo Mieli, Abel Rey, George Sarton, Henry E. Sigerist, Charles Singer, Karl Sudhoff, and Lynn Thorndike.

Publications 
 Archives internationales d'histoire des sciences (formerly Archeion)

Prizes 
 Koyré Medal

See also 
 European Society for the History of Science
 History of Science Society
 International Congress of Historical Sciences
 International Committee of Historical Sciences
 International Commission on the History of Mathematics

References

External links 
 International Academy of the History of Science website

History of science organizations
Academy of the History of Science
Scientific organizations established in 1928
1928 in international relations